Route 5 is a national route of Uruguay. In 1975, it was assigned the name Brigadier General Fructuoso Rivera, a national hero of Uruguay. It is one of the most important highways in country, along with Route 3, connecting Montevideo in the south with Rivera in the north and passing through the centre of the country. Upon reaching Santana do Livramento (the Brazilian extension of Rivera), the road joins federal highway BR-158.

The distance notation along Route 5 uses the same Kilometre Zero reference as Routes 1, 3, 6, 7, 8, 9 and IB, which is the Pillar of Peace of Plaza de Cagancha in the Centro of Montevideo.

Destinations and junctions

These are the populated places Route 5 passes through, as well as its main junctions with other National Roads.
Montevideo Department
 after its junction with Route 1, near the Ángel S. Adami Airport, Route 102 connects with Carrasco International Airport.
Canelones Department
Km. 33 Villa Felicidad
Km. 47 Canelones, Route 11 Southeast to Atlántida & Northwest to San José de Mayo
Florida Department
Km. 75 Mendoza
Km. 94 Route 12 Southeast to Minas & Punta Ballena
Km. 98 Florida
Km. 143 Sarandí Grande
Durazno Department
Km. 183 Durazno, Route 14 East to Sarandí del Yí &  La Coronilla (Coast of Rocha), West to Trinidad & Mercedes
Tacuarembó Department
Km. 249 Paso de los Toros
Km. 265 Route 20 to Fray Bentos
Km. 390 Tacuarembó, Route 26 West & Southwest to Paysandú, East & Southeast to Melo
Rivera Department
Km. 458 Route 30 Northwest to Artigas
Km. 496 Route 27 Southeast to Vichadero and Route 6
Km. 501 Rivera - connects to Brazilian Federal Roads BR-158 and BR-293.

References

External links
Viajando Por Uruguay, Rutas del Uruguay. Hoy; Ruta 5

Roads in Uruguay